Spring Valley may refer to two locations in the U.S. state of Nevada:

Spring Valley, Nevada, a town in Clark County
Spring Valley (White Pine County, Nevada), a basic in northeastern Nevada
Spring Valley Wind Farm, built in the valley in 2012